Faruq Mahfuz Anam (born 2 October 1964), known mononymously as James, is a Bangladeshi singer-songwriter, guitarist and composer, also known as a playback singer. He is the lead singer, songwriter and guitarist of the rock band Nagar Baul (previously Feelings).
He is often referred by the name "Guru" which means "Master" or "Teacher".

James was born and raised in Naogaon, but grew up in Chittagong city. James rose to mainstream fame in the 1990s as the frontman of Feelings, which is one of the "Big Three of Rock", who were responsible for developing and popularizing hard rock music in Bangladesh, along with LRB and Ark. Feelings is considered to be the pioneer of psychedelic rock in Bangladesh.

James has also led a successful solo career, with hit albums like Ananya (1989), Palabe Kothay (1995), Dukhini Dukkho Korona (1997), Thik Achhe Bondhu (1999). He sang in four Bollywood films, including Gangster (2006), Woh Lamhe (2006), Life in a... Metro (2007), Warning (2013).

James won Bangladesh National Film Award for Best Male Playback Singer twice for his performance in the films of Desha: The Leader (2014) and Swatta (2017).

Early life 

James was born in Naogaon, Rajshahi on 2 October 1964 to father, Mojammel Haque and mother, Jahanara Khatun. His father was a government employee and worked as Chairman of the Dhaka Education Board. The family originally lived in Naogaon, but moved to Chittagong in around 1958–59, when Mojammel Haque was transferred.

From his teens, James developed an avid interest in music, an interest which his family did not accept or support. He first played guitar with his friends when he was in class seven in 1975. In the early-to-mid 1970s, while learning guitar, James became interested in bands like the Doors, Dire Straits, Led Zeppelin and guitarists like Eric Clapton, Mark Knopfler and Jimi Hendrix.

Following a dispute with his family, James left his house when he was in class eight in 1976. He started living in a dormitory called Aziz Boarding in Pahartali. He joined Feelings in 1977, as the vocal and the lead guitarist.

Career

Nagar Baul (1977–present) 
After some members left Feelings in 1981, James, Fanty, Pablo and Swapan re-formed the band and started to perform in local gigs. This was the line-up at that time:
 James – lead guitar, vocals
 Ahsan Elahi (Fanty) – drums
 Pablo – keyboards, vocals
 Swapan – bass guitar

After several years of stage shows, they came to Dhaka to record their first album, Station Road. James composed all the tracks, and wrote the lyrics for five of them. Though the album was not a hit, the tracks "Ager Jonome", "Amai Jete Dao" and "Rupshagor" enjoyed moderate success.

In 1993, they released their second album Jail Theke Bolchhi (Speaking from the Jail). This album was a major hit, and Feelings became a mainstream band.

James sings psychedelic rock and blues music. He has cited Jim Morrison, Mark Knopfler, and Eric Clapton as his influences.

Many lyricists have written songs for James, including poet Shamsur Rahman, Prince Mahmud, Marjuk Rasel, Shibli and Deholovi. Musicians and Music Composers like Lucky Akhand, Manam Ahmed, Prince Mahmud and Shawkat have also composed songs for him.

The albums he released with Feelings after Station Road (Originally titled Feelings), Jail Theke Bolchhi ,Nagar Baul in 1996, Leis Fita Leis in 1998, Collection of Feelings in 1999. His first solo album was Anonna, released in 1989, followed by Palabe Kothai in 1995, Dukkhini Dukkho Korona in 1997, Thik Achhe Bondhu in 1999, Ami Tomader E Lok in 2003, Jonota Express in 2005, Toofan in 2006 and Kal Jomuna in 2009.

James later renamed Feelings as Nagar Baul. The first and only album under the new name was "Dushtu Cheler Dol, released in 2001.

Bollywood
James has been one of the most popular artists, both as a solo musician and with his band in Bangladesh and in West Bengal, since the 1990s. He met Pritam Chakraborty, an Indian Bengali music director and composer working in Bollywood, in 2004. In 2005, James did the playback for the film Gangster. The song was "Bheegi Bheegi" and it was a blockbuster hit, remaining at the top of the Bollywood Hit List for more than a month. He teamed up with Pritam again for the film Woh Lamhe in 2006 for the song "Chal Chalein", and again for "Rishtey" and "Alvida (Reprise)" in the film Life in a Metro.

James' last song in Bollywood, titled "Bebasi", was released in 2013, for the film Warning.

Media 
James first appeared in a television commercial for Pepsi in the early 2000s. This commercial was broadcast both in West Bengal and Bangladesh. In 2011, he starred in a Bangladeshi TVC for Black Horse, a brand of energy drinks. James appeared in the Bollywood movie Life in A... Metro, in which he played the role of a member of a street band, along with Pritam and Suhail Kaul.

Personal life
James was first married to Rothi. In 2002, he ended his first marriage, and married Benazir Sazzad, whom he reportedly met during a concert in New York around 1999. James has three children: daughters Jannat and Jahaan, and son Daanish.

Red Dot Entertainment
James, along with Gazi Shubhro and Jewel Paiker, co-owns the production house RED dot Multimedia Ltd. The company was established in December 2005. James is the chairman of its board of directors. The production house was behind the video commercial titled "Beautiful Bangladesh" for the ICC World Cup Cricket 2011. Red Dot Entertainment produced numerous reality TV shows including D Rock Star (2007), Lux Channel I SuperStar (2010 & 2014), and Ke Hote Chay Kotipoti (2011). Red Dot produces TVCs, music videos, TV reality shows, and corporate audiovisuals. They are planning to produce a full-length film.

Photography
James is an enthusiastic amateur photographer. He love to take photos when he travel abroad for his shows. His photos have been used into album covers.The artist is as good behind the camera as he is behind the microphone.

Discography

as "Feelings" 

 "স্টেশন রোড (Station Road) (1987) (Originally known as Feelings
 "জেল থেকে বলছি (Speaking from Jail)" (1993)
 "নগর বাউল (City Baul)" (1996)
 "লেইস ফিতা লেইস (Lace Ribbon Lace)" (1998)

as "Nagar Baul" 

 "দুষ্ট ছেলের দল (Mischievous Boys' Party)" (2001)

Solo albums 

 "অনন্যা (Unparalleled)" (1989)
 "পালাবে কোথায় (Where to Run?)" (1995)
 "দুঃখিনি দুঃখ করোনা (Don't be Sad, Sad Girl)" (1997)
 "ঠিক আছে বন্ধু (Okay, my Friend)" (1999)
 "আমি তোমাদেরই লোক (I am all Yours)" (2003)
 "জনতা এক্সপ্রেস (Peoples Express)" (2005)
 "তুফান (Typhoon)" (2007)
 "কাল যমুনা (Tidey Jamuna)" (2008)

Film soundtracks

References

External links 

 
 James web page on Bangla Band

1964 births
Living people
People from Naogaon District
21st-century Bangladeshi male singers
21st-century Bangladeshi singers
20th-century Bangladeshi male singers
20th-century Bangladeshi singers
Bangladeshi guitarists
Best Male Playback Singer National Film Award (Bangladesh) winners
Best Male Singer Bachsas Award winners
Best Male Singer Meril-Prothom Alo Award winners